Darren Purchese (born 3 February 1975) is a British pastry chef, author and television personality. He is the creator of the popular cake and dessert business, Burch & Purchese Sweet Studio, in Melbourne, Australia. Darren is a regular guest chef on Network 10's Masterchef Australia. He is scheduled to judge The Great Australian Bake Off starting in 2023.

Career

Pastry chef

In 1997, Purchese joined the pastry department at the Savoy Hotel and worked under pastry chef William Curley in the main pastry department, the bakery and in the River Restaurant. He worked his way to the position of senior pastry chef before moving to the Goring Hotel in 2000 as head pastry chef. In 2002, he moved to Raffles Brown's Hotel in Mayfair as pastry chef of '1837' restaurant where he stayed until 2003. He then moved to the Bentley Hotel in Knightsbridge as executive pastry chef. It was during his time at the Bentley Hotel that he received an Acorn Award from the magazine, Caterer and Hotelkeeper awarded to the most promising persons under the age of 30 in the UK hospitality industry.

In 2004 while working in London, Purchese was invited to present as a guest chef at The Brisbane Masterclass Weekend in Queensland, Australia. It was here that Purchese met his future wife Cath Claringbold, a Melbourne chef and restaurateur. Purchese returned to Australia, this time to Melbourne, in 2005 and began working for Shannon Bennett at his Vue de monde restaurant as head pastry chef. During Purchese's time at Vue de monde, the restaurant received '3 Chef's Hats' in The Age Good Food Guide and Best Restaurant in the Gourmet Traveller Magazine. Purchese also oversaw the pastry department in the newly opened Cafe Vue  and Bistro Vue businesses.

Since being in Australia Purchese has also worked as pastry chef for Gary Mehigan at his then restaurant Fenix, as pastry chef at Bennelong Restaurant situated in the iconic Sydney Opera House. Purchese has also acted as pastry chef consultant to many high end restaurants and food businesses most notably for George Calombaris at his The Press Club restaurant.

Purchese regularly appears as a guest chef at many Australian food events and festivals, he has presented two Masterclasses at the Melbourne Food and Wine Festival in 2010 and 2012. Purchese presented a Masterclass at the World Chef Showcase at the 2012 Crave Sydney food festival alongside illustrious chefs such as Antonio Carluccio, Jordi Roca, Christina Tosi, Massimo Bottura and Jason Atherton.

Burch & Purchese Sweet Studio 
In April 2011 Purchese opened his first business, Burch & Purchese Sweet Studio on Melbourne's shopping, dining and entertainment precinct Chapel Street. Sweet Studio is primarily a retail space producing cakes and desserts of various flavours and sizes.

B&P also serves coffee and has outdoor seating, on Chapel Street. The business is owned and operated solely by Darren and his wife Cath. Cooking demonstrations, dining and tastings have also taken place in the studio.

Television

Darren regularly appears on Australian television most notably on Network Ten's Masterchef Australia where he has presented a Masterclass in series 2, participated in an immunity challenge against eventual winner Kate Bracks in series 3, as a guest judge on an episode in season 4 and as guest chef on a Pressure Test episode in series 5. Purchese has also appeared in episodes of MasterChef Australia All-Stars and Masterchef Australia: The Professionals. Recently he has set a pressure test in series 7, where the contestants had to make his Passion flower. Series 9 saw him set a huge off site challenge where the two teams had to create edible art inspired by Darren's work.

Darren was also a regular chef presenter on Network Ten's The Circle and Scope. He has appeared on numerous travel and lifestyle programs on SBS, Nine Network Seven and the ABC. Darren also appeared in a cameo role in the television series Neighbours in 2015.

Author
Darren Purchese has written five cook books:
Sweet Studio - The Art of Divine Desserts Murdoch Books (2012) 
Lamingtons & Lemon Tart Hardie Grant Books (2016) 
Chefs Eat Toasties Too - A Pro's Guide To Reinventing Your Sandwich Game Hardie Grant Books (2017) 
Chefs Host Christmas Too - A Cook's Guide To Blitzing The Holiday Season Hardie Grant Books (2018) 
Chefs Eat Breakfast Too - An Expert's Guide To Starting The Day Right Hardie Grant Books (2019) 
Chefs Eat Toasties Too has been translated and distributed internationally under the following publishers:
Tasty Tosti's Luitingh-Sijthoff (2018) 
Sefkuchari Take Miluji Tousty Metafora (2018) 
Chefs Eat Melts Too Hardie Grant Books (2018) 
Darren has contributed recipes to a number of cook books as a guest contributor, some of the books include:
The Broadsheet Melbourne Cookbook (2015) 
''Forage - A Culinary Journey Through Victoria (2015)

Brand relationships
Darren Purchese is an ambassador for the AFL Club Sydney Swans.

Purchese is actively involved in charity work and is an ambassador for the Cancer Council Australia and My Room Children's Cancer Charity.

In 2012 Purchese collaborated with Connoisseur, an Australian ice cream producer, to design a new flavour to promote their "Uniquely Australian" range. Murray River Salted Caramel Swirl with Chocolate Coated Toasted Hazelnuts was offered on the Australian market in 2012/2013.

References

External links 

Australian television chefs
Living people
1975 births
Writers from Melbourne
Pastry chefs
Cookbook writers
Chocolatiers